ZTE Arena is a stadium in Zalaegerszeg, Hungary.  It is currently used mostly for football matches and is the home stadium of Zalaegerszegi TE.  The stadium is able to hold 11,200 people.

History
On 26 March 2017 the renovated stadium was inaugurated. All the stands of the stadium became covered. Gábor Végh, owner of the Zalaegerszegi TE, said that after 15 years the renovation of the stadium was finished. The club house, the ZTE shop, and the VIP sector was also completely renovated.

National team matches

Average attendances (Hungarian League)
2000-01: 8,124
2001-02: 9,000
2002-03: 4,719
2003-04: 4,031
2004-05: 4,667
2005-06: 3,033
2006-07: 4,033
2007-08: 3,133
2008-09: 3,809
2009-10: 3,929

Gallery

References

External links
ZTE Aréna at magyarfutball.hu

Football venues in Hungary
Zalaegerszegi TE
Buildings and structures in Zala County